This is a record of Cuba's results at the FIFA World Cup. The FIFA World Cup is an international association football competition contested by the men's national teams of the members of Fédération Internationale de Football Association (FIFA), the sport's global governing body. The championship has been awarded every four years since the first tournament in 1930, except in 1942 and 1946, due to World War II.

The tournament consists of two parts, the qualification phase and the final phase (officially called the World Cup Finals). The qualification phase, which currently take place over the three years preceding the Finals, is used to determine which teams qualify for the Finals. The current format of the Finals involves 32 teams competing for the title, at venues within the host nation (or nations) over a period of about a month. The World Cup Finals is the most widely viewed sporting event in the world, with an estimated 715.1 million people watching the 2006 tournament final.

Cuba has appeared in the quarter-finals of the FIFA World Cup on one occasion, in 1938.

Record at the FIFA World Cup

*Draws include knockout matches decided via penalty shoot-out

By match

Record by opponent

Cuba at 1938 FIFA World Cup
Head coach: José Tapia

First round

First round replay

Quarter-final

Record players
Eight players were fielded in all three matches in 1938, making them record World Cup players for Cuba.

Top goalscorers

References

External links
Cuba at FIFA

 
Countries at the FIFA World Cup
World Cup